Katerina Jebb (born 15 November 1962) is a British-born artist, photographer and film-maker.

She has previously lived and worked in Los Angeles, California. In 1989, Katerina Jebb moved to Paris.

Katerina Jebb's work is the subject of an exhibition at the Musée Réattu, Arles, July 2016-January 2017

Technique

Olivier Saillard, Director of the Musée Galliera, wrote the following text concerning her work:

I feel that Katerina Jebb desires to produce photographic works to chase away her doubts. Aided by the cold ray of light, it is the object, the clothing and sometimes even the human body that she examines in its shell, its skeleton. She turns photography into a ritual and sacred exercise in which the clothes and portraits are seen in a raw state. Her lost and rediscovered images are the absurd and drained mirrors of our worlds, of which they reveal tenderness and a sense of abandonment. Olivier Saillard Director of le Musée Galliera Paris, 2012

Exhibitions

Museum solo exhibitions

 Musée Réattu, Deus ex Machina, Retrospective, 2016-2017

Museum group exhibitions
 The Whitney Museum, New York, "The Warhol Look: Glamour, Style and Fashion" 1998
 Kunstmuseum Wolfsburg, "Avantgarderobe, Kunst und Mode im 20. Jahrhundert" 1999
 Musée Réattu, Arles, France,"Still and Living Objects and Women", 2008
 Musée Réattu, Arles, France, "Chambre d'Echo", 2009
 Musee Bourdelle, Paris, Madame Gres, La Couture A L’oeuvre, Life Size Composite Scans, 2011,
 Museum Of The Moving Image, New York, Opening Title Sequence, Birds Of Paradise, 2011
 Centre Pompidou Paris, You Can Find Beautiful Things Without Consciousness, Asvoff Festival, 2011
 Musée Réattu, Arles, Acte V, 2012
 Momu Musée d'Anvers, Madame Grés Sculptural Fashion, 2012
 Palais de Tokyo Paris, The Festival of Autumn, "The Future Will Last A Very Long Time" 2012
 Metropolitan Art Museum Tokyo, The Inventory of Balthus, 2014
 Musée Réattu, Oser la photographie, 2015-2016
 Musée Réattu, Rencontres à Réattu, 2017 
 The Worthing Museum, Isolation Chamber Vacation, 2017

Gallery and group shows

 Dover Street market, London "Comme des Garçons", mixed media installations 2008
 Art Gallery of the General Council, Aix en Provence, curator Olivier Saillard 2009 
 Contemporary Art Space of Dudelange, Luxembourg, "Faire Peau de l'Inconscient" 2009
 The Barbican Centre London, The Curve Gallery, video installation for Acne Studios 2009
 British Film Institute Southbank, Birds Eye View Film Festival 2011, Simulacrum & Hyperbole, 2011
 La Chapelle Balthus La Rossiniere, Switzerland, Le Tablier De Balthus, Documentary Film & Life Size Composite Scans, 2011
 Vara Fine Arts VPL, New York, Second Skin, 2012,
 Art Paris Grand Palais, Analix Gallery Geneva, 2012
 FIAC 2013 Hôtel de Miramion Paris, Spot – Balice Hertling in collaboration with Nilufar and Giò Marconi Gallery
 The Balthus Foundation, Le Tablier de Balthus, 2014 
 The Festival of Arles, L'Arlesienne, 2014
 Paul Kasmin Gallery New York, The Written Trace, 2015 
 Transition Gallery, London, Isolation Chamber Vacation, 2016

Permanent collections
 Musée des Arts Décoratifs du Louvre, Paris, France
 Musée Réattu, Arles, France
 Palais Galliera, Paris

Publications
 Musée Galliera, Paris Haute Couture, Olivier Saillard et Anne Zazzo, (éditions Skira Flammarion, Sophie Laporte, 2012),
 Acne Paper, interview Professor Van der Kemp, 2012
 Purple magazine interview Olivier Zahm, 2013 
 Deus Ex Machina, Katerina Jebb, exposition 2 juillet-31 décembre 2016, Musée Réattu / catalogue sous la direction de Pascale Picard 2016,

References

External links
 L'Œil de la photographie : l'Œil de la photographie, Arles 2016 : Katerina Jebb, Deus ex machina, écrit par l'Œil de la photographie, 06.07.2016
 French Vogue : Visite guidée de l'atelier de Katerina Jebb: "On peut passer de Staline à Schiaparelli", written by Hugo Compain, 15.09.2016
 Wallpaper Magazine : Katerina Jebb rips up the photographer's rule book, écrit par Daniel Thawley, 06.07.2016
 Another Magazine, A Delineation of Katerina Jebb's Exhilarating New Show, written by Professor Francis Hodgson, 15.09.2016

British artists
1962 births
Living people